Carlo Restallino (1776–1864) was an Italian painter and engraver.

He was born at Zornasco (Malesco, formerly Domodossola). Early in life, he moved to Munich, and there studied engraving under J. Dorner and M. Klotz. After that he visited Dresden, Berlin, and Italy. In 1808 he was appointed court painter at Munich, and in 1820 teacher to the household of King Maximilian Joseph. There are portraits by him of King Maximilian and Queen Caroline. He died at Munich. He was known as a portrait miniature painter.

References

1776 births
1864 deaths
18th-century Italian painters
Italian male painters
19th-century Italian painters
Italian engravers
Portrait miniaturists
Court painters
19th-century Italian male artists
18th-century Italian male artists